The 2022 CAF Confederation Cup Final was the final match of the 2021–22 CAF Confederation Cup, the 19th season of Africa's premier club football tournament organised by CAF under the current CAF Confederation Cup title after the merger of CAF Cup and African Cup Winners' Cup. It was played at the Godswill Akpabio International Stadium in Uyo, Nigeria on 20 May 2022.

Teams

Venue
For the third consecutive year, the final was played as a single match at a pre-selected venue by CAF instead of a two-legged fixtures format, which was used in the CAF competitions since 1966.

On 11 May 2022, Godswill Akpabio International Stadium in Uyo, Nigeria was chosen by a CAF Executive Committee to host the final.

Road to the final

Note: In all results below, the score of the finalist is given first (H: home; A: away).

Format
The final was played as a single match at a pre-selected venue, with the winner of semi-final 1 according to the knockout stage draw designated as the "home" team for administrative purposes. If scores were level after full time, extra time was played and if still level, the winner was decided by a penalty shoot-out (Regulations Article III. 28).

Match

Details

Statistics

See also
2022 CAF Champions League Final
2022 CAF Super Cup

Notes

References

External links
CAFonline.com

2022
Final
May 2022 sports events in Africa
Orlando Pirates F.C. matches
RS Berkane matches
Association football penalty shoot-outs